A stress position, also known as a submission position,  places the human body in such a way that a great amount of weight is placed on just one or two muscles.  For example, a subject may be forced to stand on the balls of their feet, then squat so that their thighs are parallel to the ground.  This creates an intense amount of pressure on the legs, leading first to pain and then muscle failure.

Forcing prisoners to adopt such positions is a torture technique (“enhanced interrogation technique”) that proponents claim leads to extracting information from the person being tortured.

Types of stress position

Murga punishment 

Murga (also spelled Murgha) is a stress position used as a corporal punishment mainly in parts of the Indian subcontinent (specifically Northern India, Pakistan and Bangladesh) where the punished person must squat, loop their arms behind their knees and hold their earlobes. The word murga means "chicken" or "rooster", and the name reflects how the adopted pose resembles that of a chicken laying an egg.

This punishment is mainly used on boys, and rarely on girls. Girls would receive milder punishment, such as the Hands up punishment, while boys receive Murga punishment.  Sometimes, the punished person is required to keep their buttocks raised in the air (i.e. Standing Murga), otherwise the buttocks can be rested on their heels (i.e. Sitting Murga). 

It is used primarily in educational institutions, domestically, and occasionally by the police as a summary, informal punishment for petty crime. The punishment is usually administered in public view, the purpose being to halt the offense by inflicting pain, deter recurrence of the offense by shaming the offender and providing a salutary example to others.

Hands up punishment 

The Hands up punishment is a stress position given out as punishment in schools of the Indian subcontinent (India, Bangladesh, Nepal, Sri Lanka, Pakistan). In this punishment, one is made to raise his or her hands above their head for a period of time. The recipient of the punishment is not permitted to join their hands above their head, and if they do so punishment time may be increased. The hands up position becomes painful within ten or fifteen minutes. The punishment is usually given for 30 minutes or more at a time. Sometimes one may be required to keep one leg up along with hands. The student is not allowed to change legs. Generally girls are given this punishment whereas boys are given the murga punishment.

See also
Predicament bondage
Psychological torture
Jetliner position
Strappado also known as the corda or Palestinian hanging
Submission hold

References

External links
 Human Rights First; Leave No Marks: Enhanced Interrogation Techniques and the Risk of Criminality

Imprisonment and detention
Human positions
Squatting position